Eastgate Systems is a publisher and software company headquartered in Watertown, Massachusetts, which publishes hypertext.

Eastgate is a pioneer in hypertext publishing and electronic literature and one of the best known publishers of hypertext fiction. It publishes fiction, non-fiction, and poetry hypertexts by established authors with careers in print, as well as new authors. Its software tools include Storyspace, a hypertext system created by Jay David Bolter, Michael Joyce, and John B. Smith in which much early hypertext fiction was written, and Tinderbox, a tool for managing notes and information. Storyspace was used in a project in Michigan to put judicial "bench books" into electronic form. Eastgate's chief scientist, Mark Bernstein, is a well-known figure in hypertext research, and has improved and extended Storyspace as well as developing new hypertext software.

Product list
 Tinderbox, a content assistant for managing, analyzing and mapping notes in a hypertextual environment.
 Storyspace, a hypertext writing environment. Storyspace writing environment consists of boxes (nodes) and arrows (named links) that show connections between nodes.

Fiction works published by Eastgate
 Michael Joyce: afternoon, a story (1987, 1990), Twilight, a Symphony (1996) 
 Sarah Smith: The King of Space (1991)
 Judy Malloy and Cathy Marshall; Forward Anywhere
 Judy Malloy: its name was Penelope (1993)
 Carolyn Guyer: Quibbling (1992)
 Stuart Moulthrop: Victory Garden (1992)
 Deena Larsen Marble Springs (1993), Century Cross(1994), Samplers—Nine vicious little hypertexts (1997) 
 John McDaid: Uncle Buddy's Phantom Funhouse 
 Kathryn Cramer: In Small & Large Pieces (1994)
 Shelley Jackson: Patchwork Girl (1995)
 Bill Bly: We Descend, Volume One (1997)
 Richard Holeton: Figurski at Findhorn on Acid (2001)
 J. Yellowlees Douglas: I have said nothing
 Kathleen McConnell under Kathy Mac: Unnatural Habitats
 Kathryn Cramer: In Small & Large Pieces
 Mary Kim Arnold: Lust
 Mark Bernstein: Those Trojan Girls (2016)
 Megan Heyward: Of Day, Of Night 
 Wes Chapman: Turning In
 Edward Falco: A Dream with Demons
 Rob Swigart: Down Time
 Tim McLaughlin: Notes Toward Absolute Zero
 Judith Kerman: Mothering
 Robert Kendall and Richard Smyth: A Life Set for Two
 Richard Smyth:Genetis
 Clark Humphrey The Perfect Couple

Non-fiction works published by Eastgate
 Roderick Coover:Cultures in Webs
 David Kolb: Socrates in the Labyrinth
 Diane Greco: Cyborg, engineering the body electric
 Eric Steinhart: Fragments of the Dionysian Body
 George Landow: Writing at the Edge; The Dickens Web; 
 George Landow and Jon Lanestedt:The In Memoriam Web
 Guiliano Franco: Quam Artem Exerceas

See also
 Electronic literature

Notes

References
Miller, Laura (March 15, 1998). "Bookend; www.claptrap.com". The New York Times. Retrieved on August 13, 2007.
Guernsey, Lisa (April 15, 1999). "New York Times: New Kind of Convergence: Writers and Programmers". The New York Times. Retrieved on August 13, 2007.

External links

Macintosh software companies
Software companies based in Massachusetts
Software companies of the United States
Electronic literature
Publishing companies of the United States
CD-ROM publishing companies
Interactive narrative
Publishing companies established in 1982
Companies based in Watertown, Massachusetts
1982 establishments in Massachusetts